The yellow-bellied tanager (Ixothraupis xanthogastra) is a species of bird in the family Thraupidae.

It is found in the Amazon Basin's western half.

Its natural habitats are subtropical or tropical moist lowland forests and subtropical or tropical moist montane forests.

References

yellow-bellied tanager
Birds of the Amazon Basin
Birds of the Colombian Amazon
Birds of the Venezuelan Amazon
Birds of the Ecuadorian Amazon
Birds of the Peruvian Amazon
Birds of the Bolivian Amazon
yellow-bellied tanager
yellow-bellied tanager
Taxonomy articles created by Polbot
Taxobox binomials not recognized by IUCN